Eriopezia is a genus of fungi within the Hyaloscyphaceae family. The genus contains about 30 species.

References

External links
Eriopezia at Index Fungorum

Hyaloscyphaceae